Audrius Rudys (born 6 March 1951 in Vilnius) is a Lithuanian  economist and politician.  In 1990 he was among those who signed the Act of the Re-Establishment of the State of Lithuania.

References

1951 births
Living people
Politicians from Vilnius
Members of the Seimas